The Rosedale Historic District in Homewood, Alabama is a historic district which was listed on the National Register of Historic Places in 2004. Another part of the Rosedale Neighborhood is included in the NRHP as Rosedale Park Historic District (Homewood, Alabama).

It is a hilly residential neighborhood, located somewhat inaccessibly over Red Mountain ridge, from Birmingham, Alabama.  Developers could not develop the property for white families, but the lack of transportation options did not dissuade black families, with less choices, from choosing to live there.  It grew as a working and middle class African American neighborhood.  It was surrounded by white suburbs and not allowed to expand.

It has many of "the best examples of working and middle class architecture, including residential/domestic, commercial, and religious, built c. late 1880s-1953 by and for African Americans in Jefferson County and the State of Alabama. Vernacular residential styles include many shotgun houses, particularly the concentration that remains on Loveless Street as well as a variety of bungalows and duplexes."

The history of the Rosedale Neighborhood has been documented by several local history projects by students and faculty from Samford University.

References

Historic districts on the National Register of Historic Places in Alabama
National Register of Historic Places in Jefferson County, Alabama
Victorian architecture in Alabama
Gothic Revival architecture in Alabama
Shotgun architecture